Dale Frederick Bailey is an American author of speculative fiction, including science fiction, fantasy and horror, active in the field since 1993. He writes as Dale Bailey.

Biography
Bailey grew up in Princeton, West Virginia and currently lives in North Carolina with his family.  He teaches English and Creative Writing at Lenoir Rhyne University.

Literary career
Bailey has stated, "One of the abiding disappointments of my life is that I’ve never had any of the interesting jobs that writers are supposed to have. I was never a gandy dancer or a stevedore. I never drove an ambulance on the Italian Front. I just went to school to study literature and started writing stories." He has cited Ray Bradbury as his most important literary influence, along with Zenna Henderson, Clifford D. Simak and Stephen King. Other early influences included J. R. R. Tolkien, C. S. Lewis, Robert Silverberg, George R. R. Martin, Robert A. Heinlein, and Isaac Asimov. 

His 2002 story "Death and  Suffrage" has been adapted for television as Homecoming, an episode of Showtime’s Masters of Horror series first aired in 2005.

Much of Bailey's short work has initially been published in The Magazine of Fantasy & Science Fiction, but it has also appeared in various other periodicals and webzines, including Amazing Stories, Asimov's Science Fiction, Clarkesworld Magazine, Lightspeed, Nightmare Magazine, Pulphouse, Sci Fiction, and Tor.com, as well as the original anthologies Echoes, Lovecraft Unbound: Twenty Stories, Oz Reimagined: New Tales from the Emerald City and Beyond, Queen Victoria's Book of Spells: An Anthology of Gaslamp Fantasy, and ZvR Diplomacy: A Zombies vs Robots Collection.

Some of his works have been translated into French, German, Italian, or Spanish.

Bibliography

Novels
 
House of Bones (2003)
Sleeping Policemen (2006) (with Jack Slay, Jr.)
The Subterranean Season (2015)
In the Night Wood (2018)

Short fiction 
Collections
The Resurrection Man's Legacy (2003)
The End of the End of Everything: Stories (2015) Shirley Jackson Award nomination
Stories

"Eidelman's Machine" (1993)
"Touched" (1993) 
"Notes Toward a Proof of the Theorem: Love Is Hunger" (1994)
"Conquistador" (1994)
"Giants in the Earth" (1994)
"Home Burial" (1994) 
"Epiphany" (1995)
"The Resurrection Man's Legacy" (1995)
"Sheep's Clothing" (1995) 
"The Mall" (1996)
"Interval of Stillness" (1996) 
"Quinn's Way" (1997)
"Exodus" (1997)
"Night of the Fireflies" (1998) 
"Cockroach" (1998)
"The Rain at the End of the World" (1999)
"The Anencephalic Fields" (2000)
"Inheritance" (2000)
"Heat" (2000)
"Death and Suffrage" (2002)
"In Green's Dominion" (2002)
"Hunger: A Confession" (2003)
"The Census Taker" (2003)
"The End of the World as We Know It" (2004)
"Spells for Halloween: An Acrostic" (2004)
"The Crevasse" (2009) (with Nathan Ballingrud)
"Silence" (2010)
"Eating at the End-of-the-World Café" (2010)
"Necrosis" (2012)
"The Children of Hamelin" (2012)
"Mating Habits of the Late Cretaceous" (2012)
"City So Bright" (2013)
"This Is How You Disappear" (2013)
"Mr. Splitfoot" (2013)
"The Bluehole" (2013)
"Exclusion Zone" (2013)
"A Rumor of Angels" (2013)
"The Creature Recants" (2013) 
"Sleep Paralysis" (2014)
"The End of the End of Everything" (2014) 
"The Culvert" (2014)
"Lightning Jack's Last Ride" (2015)
"The Ministry of the Eye" (2015)
"Snow" (2015)
"I Married a Monster from Outer Space" (2016)
"Teenagers from Outer Space" (2016)
"I Was a Teenage Werewolf" (2016)
"Invasion of the Saucer-Men" (2017)
"Come as You Are" (2017)
"The Donner Party" (2018)
"The Ghoul Goes West" (2018)
"Rules of Biology" (2018)
"The Horror of Party Beach" (2018)
"Precipice" (2019) 
"Das Gesicht" (2020)
"I Summon You" (2021)

Nonfiction
American Nightmares: The Haunted House Formula in American Popular Fiction (1999) 
"The H Word: The Failure of Fear" (2013)
"The H Word: Bringing the Horror Home" (2013)
"The H Word: Monsters and Metaphors" (2016)

Awards
Bailey's work has been nominated for numerous genre literary awards, and won several.

His wins include "Death and Suffrage," which won the 2002 International Horror Guild Award for Best Intermediate Form, "The End of the End of Everything," which won the 2015 Shirley Jackson Award for Best Novelette as well as placing 30th in the 2015 Locus Poll Award for Best Novelette, "I Married a Monster from Outer Space," which placed first in the 2017 Asimov's Readers' Poll for Best Novelette.

His nominations include:
"The Resurrection Man's Legacy," which was nominated for the 1996 Nebula Award for Best Novelette
"Quinn's Way," which placed 22nd in the 1998 Locus Poll Award for Best Novelette
The Fallen, which was nominated for the 2002 International Horror Guild Award for Best First Novel and was a preliminary nominee for the 2002 Bram Stoker Award for Best First Novel
"The Census Taker," which was nominated for the 2003 International Horror Guild Award for Best Intermediate Form and placed 18th in the 2004 Locus Poll Award for Best Novelette
The Resurrection Man's Legacy, which placed 19th in the 2004 Locus Poll Award for Best Collection
"The End of the World as We Know It," which was nominated for the 2004 International Horror Guild Award for Best Short Form and the 2006 Nebula Award for Best Short Story
"Eating at the End-of-the-World Café," which placed 12th in the 2011 Locus Poll Award for Best Novelette
"The Crevasse," which was nominated for the 2011 Shirley Jackson Award for Best Short Fiction
"Mating Habits of the Late Cretaceous," which placed 12th in the 2013 Locus Poll Award for Best Novelette and 4th in the 2013 Asimov's Readers' Poll for Best Novelette
"The Bluehole," which was nominated for the 2013 Bram Stoker Award for Best Long Fiction
"Sleep Paralysis," which was a preliminary nominee for the 2014 Bram Stoker Award for Short Fiction
"Snow," which was a preliminary nominee for the 2015 Bram Stoker Award for Short Fiction
The End of the End of Everything, which was nominated for the 2016 Shirley Jackson Award for Best Collection and placed 23rd in the 2016 Locus Poll Award for Best Collection
"Rules of Biology," which was a finalist in the 2019 Asimov's Readers' Poll for Best Short Story
In the Night Wood, which was nominated for the 2019 Shirley Jackson Award for Best Novel, the 2019 World Fantasy Award for Best Novel, the 2019 Manly Wade Wellman Award for North Carolina Science Fiction & Fantasy, as well as placing 4th in the 2019 Locus Poll Award for Best Horror Novel
"The Donner Party," which placed 9th in the 2019 Locus Poll Award for Best Novelette
"The Ghoul Goes West," which placed 30th in the 2019 Locus Poll Award for Best Novelette.

References

External links 
 

1968 births
Living people
21st-century American writers
American speculative fiction writers
Asimov's Science Fiction people
People from Princeton, West Virginia
Writers from West Virginia